Friant (formerly, Converse Ferry, Jones Ferry, Hamptonville, and Pollasky) is a census-designated place (CDP) in Fresno County, California, United States. The population was 549 at the 2010 census, down from 778 at the 2000 census.

Geography
The CDP is located along the banks of the San Joaquin River and at the base of Friant Dam and Millerton Lake.

Climate
Friant has a hot-summer Mediterranean climate (Csa) typical of California's Central Valley with hot, dry summers and cool, rainier winters.

History
The place was first called Converse Ferry for Charles Converse, who established a ferry across the San Joaquin River in 1852. It was renamed Jones Ferry for J.R. Jones, a local merchant. The post office came in 1881 and named the place Hamptonville, after William R. Hampton, its first postmaster. The Southern Pacific Railroad arrived in 1891 and named the place Pollasky for Marcus Pollasky, a railroad official. In the 1920s the place was renamed for Thomas Friant, a lumber company executive.

 Unknown Date: Mugginsville
 1852-≤1863: Converse Ferry or Converse
 ≤1863-1881: Jones Ferry or Jonesville
 1881-1891: Hamptonville
 1891-1907: Pollasky
 1907-present: Friant

Demographics

2010
At the 2010 census Friant had a population of 509. The racial makeup of Friant was 433 (85.1%) White, 4 (0.8%) African American, 14 (2.8%) Native American, 7 (1.4%) Asian, 0 (0.0%) Pacific Islander, 11 (2.2%) from other races, and 40 (7.9%) from two or more races. Hispanic or Latino of any race were 63 people (12.4%).

The whole population lived in households, no one lived in non-institutionalized group quarters and no one was institutionalized.

There were 224 households, 47 (21.0%) had children under the age of 18 living in them, 111 (49.6%) were opposite-sex married couples living together, 21 (9.4%) had a female householder with no husband present, 9 (4.0%) had a male householder with no wife present.  There were 12 (5.4%) unmarried opposite-sex partnerships, and 5 (2.2%) same-sex married couples or partnerships. 61 households (27.2%) were one person and 33 (14.7%) had someone living alone who was 65 or older. The average household size was 2.27.  There were 141 families (62.9% of households); the average family size was 2.75.

The age distribution was 83 people (16.3%) under the age of 18, 35 people (6.9%) aged 18 to 24, 82 people (16.1%) aged 25 to 44, 169 people (33.2%) aged 45 to 64, and 140 people (27.5%) who were 65 or older.  The median age was 51.8 years. For every 100 females, there were 111.2 males.  For every 100 females age 18 and over, there were 110.9 males.

There were 252 housing units at an average density of ,of which 224 were occupied, 171 (76.3%) by the owners and 53 (23.7%) by renters.  The homeowner vacancy rate was 5.5%; the rental vacancy rate was 8.6%.  381 people (74.9% of the population) lived in owner-occupied housing units and 128 people (25.1%) lived in rental housing units.

2000
At the 2000 census there were 519 male and 259 female (total: 778) people, 226 households, and 148 families in the CDP. The racial makeup of the CDP was 89.21% White, 1.93% Native American, 1.93% Asian, 0.19% Pacific Islander, 2.70% from other races, and 4.05% from two or more races.  10.02% of the population were Hispanic or Latino of any race.
Of the 226 households 19.5% had children under the age of 18 living with them, 53.5% were married couples living together, 7.5% had a female householder with no husband present, and 34.5% were non-families. 27.9% of households were one person and 9.7% were one person aged 65 or older.  The average household size was 2.27 and the average family size was 2.70.

The age distribution was 18.7% under the age of 18, 4.6% from 18 to 24, 23.1% from 25 to 44, 28.5% from 45 to 64, and 25.0% 65 or older.  The median age was 48 years. For every 100 females, there were 100.4 males.  For every 100 females age 18 and over, there were 104.9 males.

The median household income was $30,234 and the median family income  was $35,792. Males had a median income of $24,808 versus $32,188 for females. The per capita income for the CDP was $17,878.  About 12.7% of families and 12.6% of the population were below the poverty line, including 14.0% of those under age 18 and 6.0% of those age 65 or over.

References

Census-designated places in Fresno County, California
Populated places established in 1852
Census-designated places in California
1852 establishments in California